January 2010

See also

References 

List of killings by law enforcement officers in the United States, 2010
 01
January 2010 events in the United States